Maggie Carpenter may refer to:

Maggie Carpenter (One Life to Live), fictional character on the American soap opera One Life to Live
Maggie Carpenter, main character in Runaway Bride (1999 film)

See also
Margaret Carpenter (disambiguation)